The 1Line, formerly Central Link, is a light rail line in Seattle, Washington, United States, and part of Sound Transit's Link light rail system. The line connects the University District, Downtown Seattle, the Rainier Valley, and Seattle–Tacoma International Airport. The 1Line carried over 25 million total passengers in 2019, with an average of nearly 80,000 daily passengers on weekdays. It runs for 20 hours per day on weekdays and Saturdays, with headways of up to six minutes during peak hours, and reduced 18-hour service on Sundays and holidays.

Trains are composed of two or more cars that each can carry 194 passengers, including 74 in seats, along with wheelchairs and bicycles. Fares are calculated based on distance traveled and are paid through the regional ORCA card, paper tickets, or a mobile app. Sound Transit uses proof-of-payment to verify passenger fares, employing fare ambassadors and transit police to conduct random inspections. All stations have ticket vending machines, public art, bicycle parking, and bus connections, while several also have park-and-ride lots.

Voters approved Central Link in a 1996 ballot measure and construction began in 2003, after the project was reorganized under a new budget and truncated route in response to higher than expected costs. The line was temporarily renamed the Red Line until its designation was changed to the 1Line in 2021, coinciding with an extension to Northgate.

Further extensions to Lynnwood and Federal Way are planned to open in 2024 and 2025, respectively. The 2 Line will open in 2023, connecting Seattle to the Eastside suburbs and forming a multi-line network via its connection with the 1Line. Further expansion under Sound Transit 3 will divide the current corridor between two lines, the 1Line from Ballard to Tacoma and the 3 Line from Everett to West Seattle.

History

Background and early transit proposals

Public transit service within Seattle began in 1884, with the introduction of the city's first horse-drawn streetcar line. The system had been replaced with a network of electric streetcars and cable cars by the end of the decade, which spurred the development of new streetcar suburbs across modern-day Seattle. Interurban railways to Everett, Tacoma, and the Rainier Valley were established after the turn of the century, giving the region an intercity passenger rail system to feed the streetcar lines. The interurban system failed to compete with the increasing popularity of automobile travel, capped by the completion of U.S. Route 99 in the late 1920s, and was shut down. By 1941, the streetcars had also been acquired by the municipal government and replaced with a trolleybus network.

Various proposals for a rapid transit system in Seattle, to replace the streetcar—and later bus—networks, were presented in the 20th century and rejected by city officials or voters due to their cost or other factors. In 1911, urban planner Virgil Bogue proposed a  system of subway tunnels and elevated railways as the centerpiece to a comprehensive plan for the city, which was rejected by voters. The Seattle Center Monorail, originally built for the 1962 World's Fair, has been the subject of several unsuccessful expansion proposals backed by Governor Albert Rosellini in the 1960s and Seattle voters in the early 2000s. The Forward Thrust Committee of the late 1960s proposed a  rapid transit system, to connect Downtown Seattle to Ballard, the University District, Lake City, Capitol Hill, Bellevue, and Renton. The federal government offered to fund two-thirds of the rail system's capital costs, approximately $770 million (equivalent to $ in  dollars), if $385 million (equivalent to $ in  dollars) in local property taxes were approved by voters. The rapid transit initiative was placed on the ballot in February 1968, but fell short of supermajority needed to pass. A second attempt in May 1970, with $440 million (equivalent to $ in  dollars) in local funding and $870 million (equivalent to $ in  dollars) in federal funding, failed amid a local economic downturn caused by layoffs at Boeing. The federal funding earmarked towards the rapid transit system was granted to Atlanta, Georgia, forming the initial funding for the Metropolitan Atlanta Rapid Transit Authority's rail system.

Light rail planning

Following the failed Forward Thrust initiatives, Metro Transit was created in 1972 to oversee a countywide bus network, and plan for a future rail system. In the early 1980s, Metro Transit and the Puget Sound Council of Governments (PSCOG) explored light rail and busway concepts to serve the region, ultimately choosing to build a downtown transit tunnel that would be convertible from buses to light rail at a later date. The PSCOG formally endorsed a light rail plan in 1986, recommending a system be built by 2020, and include a line between Seattle and Sea-Tac Airport, with routing alternatives that served the Rainier Valley. A 1988 advisory measure on light rail planning was passed in King County, encouraging Metro Transit to accelerate the plan's timeline to open by 2000. In 1990, the state legislature endorsed the creation of a regional transit board composed of politicians from King, Pierce, and Snohomish counties, with the goal of implementing the regional transit plan. Several members of the Seattle City Council endorsed the rail plan on the condition that it pass through the Rainier Valley, by then an economically disadvantaged and majority-minority neighborhood.

The Central Puget Sound Regional Transit Authority, later renamed Sound Transit, was created in 1993 to write and present a regional transit plan for voter approval. The agency proposed a  light rail network as the centerpiece of a $6.7 billion transit ballot measure, with a surface line through the Rainier Valley and tunnels between Downtown Seattle, Capitol Hill, and the University District. Voters approved the $3.9 billion package on November 5, 1996, along with increases to sales taxes and motor vehicle excise taxes across the regional transit district. Sound Transit considered several routing options during a series of public hearings and studies early into the project's environmental impact study, which adopted the name "Central Link". In 1999, Sound Transit selected the alignment for the light rail project, consisting of a line between the University District and Sea-Tac Airport, with surface segments passing through Tukwila, the Rainier Valley, and SoDo, and tunnels under Beacon Hill, First Hill, Capitol Hill, and Portage Bay.

Budget issues and delays

The Central Link project was originally planned to open in 2006 and projected to cost $1.9 billion (equivalent to $ in  dollars), but the estimates were found to be unrealistic by auditors in November 2000. New executives, hired by Sound Transit to replace previous program directors, presented a revised plan with an opening date pushed back three years to 2009 and a $3.8 billion (equivalent to $ in  dollars) cost estimate. Planning of the Portage Bay tunnel between Capitol Hill and the University District was suspended due to higher than expected contractor bids, attributed to difficult soil conditions. Sound Transit adopted the revised budget and schedule in January 2001, including provisions to re-study routing options between Downtown Seattle and the University District, along with a $500 million federal grant agreement to fund the construction of an "initial segment" for the project. The remaining routes to the airport and University District were sent back to the planning stage, and re-organized into separate light rail projects.

In November 2001, Sound Transit approved construction of the shortened Central Link light rail project, calling for a summer 2002 groundbreaking. Property acquisition in the Rainier Valley began in March 2002, but two legal battles delayed the start of construction. In November 2002, the King County Superior Court ruled in favor of Sound Transit in a lawsuit filed by light rail opponents, alleging that it lacked the authority to shorten a voter-approved line. The approval of Tim Eyman's Initiative 776 threatened to repeal motor vehicle excise taxes needed to fund Sound Transit's budget, but was declared unconstitutional in February 2003. Another routing change requested by the City of Tukwila, placing light rail tracks along freeways in lieu of International Boulevard, was approved by Sound Transit and the Federal Transit Administration in 2002, moving the project closer to construction.

Construction and testing

Sound Transit received its $500 million federal grant agreement in October 2003, and a groundbreaking ceremony was held in SoDo on November 8, 2003. Construction contracts for various segments were awarded in 2004 and 2005, coming six percent under Sound Transit's estimates, and work began along all parts of the system. The first rails were installed on August 18, 2005, in the SoDo area; a month later, the downtown transit tunnel closed for a two-year renovation to accommodate light rail service. Excavation of the Beacon Hill tunnel and station began in 2005, and two tunnel boring machines were launched in early 2006 to bore the twin tunnels between SoDo and the Rainier Valley.

The SODO and Stadium stations were completed in May 2006, and light rail testing in the SoDo area began the following March. Testing was extended to the re-opened downtown transit tunnel in September 2007, initially limited to weekends without bus service, and further to the Rainier Valley after the completion of the Beacon Hill tunnel in 2008. The elevated guideway in Tukwila, including crossings over major freeways and the Duwamish River, was completed in 2007 after the installation of 2,457 precast concrete segments and balanced cantilever bridges. During construction in the Rainier Valley, Sound Transit and the City of Seattle offered $50 million in mitigation funds and development opportunities to affected businesses. Construction of light rail along Martin Luther King Jr. Way South also resulted in utility lines being moved underground, improved sidewalks, street crossings, and landscaping.

Opening and first extensions

Central Link was opened on July 18, 2009, with a community celebration that attracted more than 92,000 riders over the first weekend of free service. The  extension to SeaTac/Airport station opened on December 19, 2009, replacing the shuttle and other bus services to the airport. Sound Transit added lubrication equipment and rubber mats to segments in Tukwila and the Rainier Valley in 2010 to reduce noise levels that had reached up to 83 decibels, surpassing federal safety standards and triggering noise complaints from nearby residents. A contract dispute with the Rainier Valley construction contractor was settled in 2011, bringing the project's total price to $117 million below the $2.44 billion budget. The opening of light rail service to the Rainier Valley spurred new transit-oriented development, which had initially stalled during the Great Recession but recovered in the mid-2010s.

Central Link train service was increased to a frequency of 6 minutes during peak hours, from 7.5 minutes, in 2015 to prepare for the opening of the University Link extension. The line was extended north to University of Washington station, via Capitol Hill station, on March 19, 2016, via a $1.8 billion,  tunnel. The extension opened six months ahead of its scheduled date, and the opening celebrations drew 67,000 people during the first day of service. Sound Transit deployed additional three-car light rail trains to cope with higher ridership after the extension opened.

The escalators at Capitol Hill and University of Washington stations experienced several major failures and shutdowns in the two years since the University Link extension was opened. These failures were attributed to the installation of standard commercial escalators instead of stronger escalators designed for transit stations. A new escalator contractor was selected to provide preventative maintenance in lieu of a proposed replacement plan; new stairways and connecting passageways were also opened to allow for alternative access. The Tukwila section of the line was shut down over one weekend in October 2018 for major repairs after cracks were discovered in the rails on the  bridge crossing Interstate 5.

Renaming and Northgate extension

Central Link was renamed to the "Red Line" as part of a systemwide rebranding in September 2019 by Sound Transit to prepare for the arrival of East Link (the Blue Line). Two months later, the agency announced that it would consider a new name after complaints due to the similarity of the "Red Line" with redlining, which historically affected residents of the Rainier Valley. A new designation, the 1Line (colored green), was announced in April 2020 and took effect in September 2021.

In January 2020, Sound Transit began a ten-week construction project called "Connect 2020" that required trains to single-track in the Downtown Seattle Transit Tunnel. The closure of tracks for work on the East Link Extension where it meets the existing tracks at International District/Chinatown necessitated the construction of a temporary center platform at Pioneer Square for use by through-riding passengers. Sound Transit deployed four-car trains running every 13–15 minutes and implemented restrictions on carrying bicyclists on trains through downtown. The project was completed in late March after a week-long delay in testing, but the frequency restrictions remained due to the coronavirus pandemic and local shutdowns. Service was reduced to every 30 minutes in April and partially restored in September to every 8 minutes during peak hours and 15 minutes during most other hours. The first of the new "Series 2" light rail vehicles, based on the Siemens S700, entered service in May 2021.

The third expansion of the 1Line, a  northern extension from University of Washington station to the Northgate neighborhood of Seattle, was funded by the Sound Transit 2 ballot measure in 2008 and began construction in 2012. The  tunnel was excavated between July 2014 and September 2016 using two tunnel boring machines, creating a pair of bores between the extension's three stations. The southernmost section of the extension passes under the University of Washington campus and required several mitigation measures to reduce electromagnetic interference for laboratory equipment, including rubber dampeners on floating slabs of track and the relocation of sensitive equipment at four facilities. The Northgate extension opened on October 2, 2021, adding three stations to the line's north end.

Route

The northern terminus of the 1Line is Northgate station, located adjacent to the Northgate Mall along Interstate 5 in North Seattle. The line heads south along an elevated guideway that dives into the Northgate Link tunnel in the Maple Leaf neighborhood. The  tunnel travels southeast through Roosevelt, serving a station near Northeast 65th Street, and south to U District station before reaching the University of Washington campus. The tunnel travels southeast under the campus to University of Washington station, located near Husky Stadium, from which it heads south in the University Link tunnel, crossing under the Montlake Cut of the Lake Washington Ship Canal and State Route 520 before taking a turn to the southwest. The tunnel climbs Capitol Hill and passes under Interlaken Park and Volunteer Park before turning due south to enter Capitol Hill station on the east side of Broadway. The tunnel makes a gradual turn to the west, dipping as far south as East Union Street, and crosses under Interstate 5 at Pine Street. It merges into the Downtown Seattle Transit Tunnel within the Pine Street Stub Tunnel, where it formerly merged with buses from Convention Place station.

The downtown transit tunnel, formerly shared between light rail trains and buses, travels west under Pine Street through Westlake station and south on 3rd Avenue through University Street and Pioneer Square stations in Downtown Seattle. The tunnel ends at International District/Chinatown station, adjacent to King Street Station (served by Amtrak and Sounder commuter rail), and the 1Line travels south through SoDo along the east side of the SODO Busway. The SoDo section has two stations, Stadium and SODO, and includes several gated crossings. From SODO station, the track ascends to an elevated guideway traveling east along South Forest Street, passing the line's railyard and maintenance facility. The elevated trackway passes over Airport Way and comes to rest on an embankment under Interstate 5, entering the Beacon Hill tunnel.

The Beacon Hill tunnel travels approximately  under Beacon Hill, serving a station at Beacon Avenue South. Trains exit the tunnel on the east side of the hill, turning southeast and approaching the elevated Mount Baker station at the intersection of Rainier Avenue South and Martin Luther King Jr. Way South. Light rail trains descend from Mount Baker station onto the median of Martin Luther King Jr. Way South, running at-grade with signal priority at 28 street crossings.

The line enters Tukwila and crosses west over Interstate 5 and a mainline railroad at Boeing Access Road, near Boeing Field, before making a southward turn over East Marginal Way South. The 1Line continues south over the Duwamish River, traveling non-stop through Tukwila on a  elevated guideway. The guideway runs along the west sides of State Route 599 and Interstate 5 towards Southcenter Mall, where it turns west along State Route 518. The line passes through Tukwila International Boulevard station, home to a 600-stall park and ride facility, and turns south into the median of the Airport Expressway towards SeaTac. Light rail trains continue along the east side of Seattle–Tacoma International Airport, stopping at SeaTac/Airport station near the airport's terminals, before reaching Angle Lake station, where it terminates.

The 1Line, while officially a "light rail" line, has also been described as a "light metro" hybrid by transit experts due to its grade separated sections and use of longer trainsets than typical American light rail systems. Approximately  of the  line is at-grade, including segments along freeways that are separated from intersecting roads.

Stations

Some stations are grade separated, with underground or elevated platforms connected to surface entrances by stairs, escalators, and elevators, while others were built at street level. The line's sixteen stations include bus connections, ticket vending machines, real-time arrivals information signs, public art, and bicycle parking. Stations are also designed with clear sight lines on platforms, emergency phones and lights, and are monitored with surveillance cameras.

All stations are connected to local bus routes, including parallel King County Metro services that stop at multiple Link stations. Since 2019, a set of five stations in the Rainier Valley and Tukwila have had on-demand ride-hail shuttle service that accepts Metro fares and is operated by private contractor Via with subsidies from the city government. , there are only three stations that have park and ride facilities (Angle Lake, Northgate, and Tukwila International Boulevard); for other stations, Sound Transit and local governments encourage alternative means of transportation to and from stations, including bus riding, walking, or bicycling.

Notes

Service

1Line trains run 20 hours per day from Monday to Saturday, from 5:00 am to 1:00 am, and 18 hours on Sundays and federal holidays, from 6:00 am to midnight. Trains operate most frequently during weekday peak periods, running every eight minutes from 6:00 am to 9:30 am and from 3:00 pm to 6:30 pm. Trains run every 10 minutes during midday and evening hours on weekdays and all day on weekends. Train frequency is reduced to every 15 minutes during the early morning and late night hours of all days.

End-to-end travel from Northgate to Angle Lake stations takes 57 minutes, while trips between SeaTac/Airport station and Downtown Seattle take 38 minutes. The SeaTac–Westlake corridor was formerly served by King County Metro bus route 194, which took 32 minutes to travel between the two areas, and used bus stops that were closer to the terminal. The bus route ran at less frequent intervals, was subject to traffic delays, and had shorter hours of operation.

Ridership

1Line trains carried over 25 million total passengers in 2019, averaging 79,674 riders on weekdays. Ridership is measured by on-board infrared passenger counters that automatically record the number of people entering and leaving the train. Approximately 32 percent of Series 1 vehicles have automatic passenger counters, while all Series 2 vehicles include them.

Ridership on the 1Line has risen significantly from the beginning of service in 2009, when it averaged 15,500 per weekday. In 2010, ridership fell below projected levels due to the ongoing economic downturn, with only 21,611 daily riders on the line. Ridership increased significantly in the following years, surpassing 25,000 daily riders in 2012, 30,000 in 2014, and 35,000 in 2015.

The opening of the University Link extension in March 2016 increased daily ridership by 66 percent in its first month of operation, and averaged 66,203 daily riders during the last quarter of the year. A single-day ridership record of 82,361 estimated boardings was set on April 8, 2016, credited to a Seattle Mariners home opener and the Emerald City Comic Con. The record was surpassed five months later on September 30, estimated at 101,000 riders, due in part to home games for the Washington Huskies football team and Seattle Mariners. Ridership fell to 9.7 million total passengers in 2020, a decline of 61 percent from 2019, due to the COVID-19 pandemic and other service reductions.

Fares

The 1Line uses a proof-of-payment system, requiring valid payment before boarding and lacking a turnstile barrier at stations. Fares can be purchased as paper tickets at ticket vending machines at stations, credit or passes loaded on an ORCA card, or through a mobile ticketing app. Fare ambassadors check for valid fares while aboard trains or in the fare-paid zone of stations; passengers who do not present a valid ticket or validated ORCA card are offered educational materials and warnings. Until 2021, fare inspectors and transit police officers checked fares and issued warnings or a $124 citation to passengers who did not present a valid form of payment. Following the dismissal of fare inspectors, an estimated 42 percent of passengers in January 2022 did not pay their fare. A new program led by fare ambassadors was approved in September 2022, enacting a multi-step system with monetary penalties beginning with the third violation and a $124 infraction for a fifth violation.

Fares are calculated based on distance traveled, ranging from $2.25 to $3.50 for adults. ORCA card users are required to tap a reader before and after riding a train to calculate the fare. Reduced fares are available to elderly passengers, persons with disabilities, and low-income passengers enrolled in ORCA Lift. Transfers from other modes, including buses, water taxis, and streetcars, are only accepted using ORCA cards. Since September 2022, fares for passengers under the age of 18 have been free as part of a statewide transit grant.

Rolling stock and equipment

The original "Series 1" fleet used on the 1Line consisted of 62 low-floor light rail vehicles manufactured in Japan by Kinkisharyo. The Kinkisharyo vehicles, built through a joint venture with Mitsui & Co., have 74 seats and can carry 194 seated and standing passengers at standard capacity; a maximum "crush load" of 252 passengers per car can be carried by Link trains for short distances. The interior is 70 percent low-floor, while the remaining 30 percent is raised above the floor and accessed via stairs. Railcars include four doors on each side, fold-up seating areas for wheelchairs, and two bicycle hooks above luggage storage areas. 1Line trains are typically arranged into four-car sets, but until 2021 all trains were two or three cars long. Link uses a form of positive train control to prevent trains from exceeding the set speed limit for a given area.

Sound Transit placed its initial order of 31 light rail vehicles in 2003, and added four more vehicles in 2005 for the extension to SeaTac/Airport station. The cars were assembled in Everett, to comply with Buy America requirements, and delivered from 2006 to 2008. Another 27 vehicles were ordered for the University Link extension in 2009 and were delivered from 2010 to 2011. The 1Line fleet is stored and maintained at a  operating base in SoDo, between SODO and Beacon Hill stations. It opened in 2007, at a cost of $74 million to construct, and has a capacity of 105 light rail vehicles, including nine bays inside the  maintenance building that can hold 16 vehicles. 1Line trains are operated and maintained by King County Metro under a contract with Sound Transit that was renewed in 2019 and is set to expire at the end of 2023.

In September 2016, Sound Transit approved a $554 million order to Siemens Mobility for 122 S700 "Series 2" light rail vehicles that will serve planned extensions to Northgate, Lynnwood, the Eastside, and Federal Way. Another 30 vehicles were added to the order in April 2017, bringing the total to 152 vehicles. The first Series 2 car  arrived at Sound Transit's maintenance facility in June 2019, featuring the same seating capacity but a wider central walkway and other new features. The first Siemens cars entered service on May 14, 2021. A satellite maintenance facility, with a capacity of 96 vehicles, is planned to be constructed in Bellevue to accommodate part of the new fleet.

Future plans

Sound Transit's expansion ballot measures, passed as Sound Transit 2 in 2008 and Sound Transit 3 in 2016, enabled the planning of future Link light rail extensions, scheduled to open in stages between 2021 and 2040. The Northgate Link extension opened on October 2, 2021, and is set to be followed by the East Link Extension in 2023, creating a new line to Bellevue and Redmond. During construction related to East Link in early 2020, trains within the downtown transit tunnel were temporarily limited to single-track operations and divided into two lines at Pioneer Square station.

As part of the Sound Transit 2 program, the 1Line will be extended north to Lynnwood in 2024 and south to Federal Way in 2025. The line would have trains every eight minutes at peak and ten minutes mid-day and on weekends, with a combined frequency of four minutes at peak and five minutes off-peak between International District/Chinatown and Lynnwood City Center stations. In 2032, the 3 Line to West Seattle will begin service, temporarily operating between Alaska Junction and SODO station. The opening of an extension to Ballard by 2039, traveling via a new tunnel through Downtown Seattle, will split the corridor between two lines: the 1Line, operating from Ballard to Tacoma via the Rainier Valley and Sea-Tac Airport; and the 3Line, operating from Lynnwood (and later Everett) to West Seattle. Two infill stations along the current route of the 1Line are planned to open in 2031 at South Graham Street in the Rainier Valley and Boeing Access Road in northern Tukwila.

Notes

References

External links

 
 Official Sound Transit website

1500 V DC railway electrification
2009 establishments in Washington (state)
Seattle
Link light rail
Railway lines opened in 2009
Transportation in King County, Washington
Transportation in Seattle